David S. Frankel (born 1950) is an American Information Technology expert and consultant, known for his work on model-driven engineering and semantic information modeling.

Biography 
Frankel obtained his BS in Mathematics from the University of Illinois at Urbana-Champaign, and sequentially his Master of Social Work at the same university.

Frankel started his career in the software industry in the 1970s, developing software tool for HP 2100 mini-computers and became senior Programmer-Analyst. In 1982 he started as independent consultant participating in the development of Local area network-based database applications. He was Enterprise Architect for several companies, and was Lead Standards Architect in the domain of Model-Driven Systems at SAP Labs in California from 2005 to 2012, and independent consultant ever since.

Frankel has been on the Architecture Board of the Object Management Group (OMG) for a long time. In 2003 he published his most cited work "Model Driven Architecture: Applying Mda to Enterprise Computing."

Selected publications 
 Frankel, David S. Model Driven Architecture Applying Mda to Enterprise Computing. John Wiley & Sons, 2003.
 Parodi, John, and David S. Frankel. The MDA journal: model driven architecture straight from the masters. Meghan-Kiffer Press, 2004.

Articles, a selection:
 David S. Frankel, Harmon, P., Mukerji, J., Odell, J., Owen, M., Rivitt, P., Rosen, M... & Soley, R. M. et al. (2003) "The Zachman Framework and the OMG's Model Driven Architecture," Business Process Trends, 9 (2003).
 Frankel, David S. "The MDA marketing message and the MDA reality." MDA Journal, a Business Process Trends Column (2004).
 Frankel, David S., et al. "A Model-Driven Semantic Web: Reinforcing Complementary Strengths." MDA Journal, Business Process Trends (2004).
 Frankel, D., Hayes, P., Kendall, E., & McGuinness, D. (2004). "The model driven semantic web." In 1st International Workshop on the Model-Driven Semantic Web (MDSW2004), Monterey, California, USA.

References

External links 
 Published Articles Written by David S. Frankel

1950 births
Living people
American computer scientists
Information systems researchers
University of Illinois Urbana-Champaign alumni